Southern Steel are a New Zealand netball team based in Invercargill. Between 2008 and 2016, they played in the ANZ Championship. Since 2017 they have represented Netball South in the ANZ Premiership. Netball South is the governing body that represents Southland and Otago. In 2017 they won their first premiership when they were the inaugural ANZ Premiership winners. In 2018 they won their second premiership when they retained the title. In 2017 Steel were the inaugural winners of the Netball New Zealand Super Club tournament.

History

Formation 
Southern Steel was formed in 2007. The new team was effectively a merger of the two former National Bank Cup teams, Southern Sting and Otago Rebels. Steel subsequently became founder members of the ANZ Championship. Ahead of the 2008 ANZ Championship season, Robyn Broughton was appointed the team's first head coach and Jenny-May Coffin and Megan Hutton were named as co-captains.

ANZ Championship
Between 2008 and 2016, Southern Steel played in the ANZ Championship. In both 2009 and 2010, Steel finished 4th during the regular season and qualified for the playoffs. However on both occasions they failed to progress beyond the semifinals. Steel's best performance during the ANZ Championship era came in  
2016. With a team coached by Noeline Taurua, captained by Wendy Frew and featuring Gina Crampton, Jhaniele Fowler-Reid, Shannon Francois, and Jane Watson, Steel finished the season as minor premiers.

Regular season statistics

ANZ Premiership 
Since 2017, Steel have played in the ANZ Premiership. With a team coached by Reinga Bloxham, captained by Wendy Frew and featuring Gina Crampton, Jhaniele Fowler-Reid, Shannon Francois, and Jane Watson, Steel finished the 2017 season as inaugural ANZ Premiership winners. After finishing the regular season unbeaten and as minor premiers, Steel defeated Central Pulse 69–53 in the grand final. This saw Steel complete a 16 match unbeaten season. However, Steel's perfect season was almost derailed on 12 June when a van with six of their players on board was involved in a road traffic accident in Fendalton, Christchurch. Four of the players were injured. Wendy Frew received over seventy stitches and under went surgery while Te Paea Selby-Rickit suffered a dual fractured rib. Shannon Francois and Jhaniele Fowler-Reid had minor injuries. Just two days later, on 14 June, with the four injured players replaced by four players recruited from their Beko Netball League team, Steel notched up win number 14 of the season against Mainland Tactix. Despite been 41–38 down after three quarters, Steel launched a comeback in the fourth quarter to win 51–46.

Steel remained unbeaten as they went onto win the 2017 Netball New Zealand Super Club tournament, defeating Northern Mystics 79–58 in the final. The run continued into the 2018 season. However after defeating Mystics in their opening match, they were beaten 62–51 by Pulse, ending a 22–match win streak. The streak included 17 ANZ Premiership matches and five Super Club matches. Despite this and despite losing two key players, Jhaniele Fowler-Reid and Jane Watson, Steel went onto to retain their title. In the 2018 grand final they again defeated Pulse. 

Regular season statistics

Grand finals
ANZ Premiership

Netball New Zealand Super Club

Home venues

Steel's main home venue is Stadium Southland. They also play some home games at Dunedin's Edgar Centre. During the 2011, 2012 and 2013 seasons, while Stadium Southland was unavailable following a roof collapse in September 2010, Steel played their Invercargill home games at the ILT Velodrome.

Notable players

2023 squad

Internationals

 Rachel Rasmussen
 Hayley Saunders

 Natasha Chokljat
 Megan Dehn
 Demelza McCloud

 George Fisher

 Jhaniele Fowler
 Malysha Kelly

 Julianna Naoupu
 Rachel Rasmussen
 Sheryl Scanlan
 Saviour Tui

 Leana de Bruin
 Lenize Potgieter

 Kalifa McCollin

Captains

Award winners

ANZ Championship awards
ANZ Championship MVP

Notes
  Leana de Bruin shared the 2011 award with Natalie Medhurst (Queensland Firebirds).
  In 2015 and 2016 Jhaniele Fowler was the MVP player in the New Zealand Conference. 

ANZ Championship Best New Talent

New Zealand Netball Awards
New Zealand ANZ Championship Player of the Year

ANZ Premiership Player of the Year

Coaches

Head coaches

Assistant coaches

Reserve team
Since 2016, Netball South have entered a team in the National Netball League. They are effectively the reserve team of Southern Steel. They originally played simply as Netball South before becoming known as Southern Blast. In 2016, Netball South won the inaugural NNL title after defeating Central Zone 51–46 in the grand final. At the 2016 New Zealand Netball Awards, Netball South winning the inaugural title was named Moment of the Year.

Honours

ANZ Premiership
Winners: 2017, 2018
Minor premiers: 2017
ANZ Championship
Minor premiers: 2016
Netball New Zealand Super Club
Winners: 2017

References

External links 
 Official website
  Southern Steel on Facebook
  Southern Steel on Twitter

 
ANZ Premiership teams
ANZ Championship teams
Netball teams in New Zealand
Sport in Dunedin
Sport in Invercargill
Sports clubs established in 2007
2007 establishments in New Zealand
Organisations based in Invercargill